Cryptotia is the condition where an ear appears to have its upper portion buried underneath the side of the head.  The condition also involves underdeveloped scapha and antihelical crura.  Cryptotia is also known as buried ear or hidden ear.

Treatment

Cryptotia is often treated through surgery which involves releasing the ear from its buried position, reshaping the cartilage and using local tissue to resurface the released cartilage.

See also
 Otoplasty
 Ear shaping
 Otolaryngology

References

External links 

Congenital disorders of ears
Diseases of the ear and mastoid process